Anirudh Singh (born 2 August 1980) is an Indian former cricketer. He played 47 first-class matches for Hyderabad between 2000 and 2010. In January 2021, he was appointed as the coach of Hyderabad.

See also
 List of Hyderabad cricketers

References

External links
 

1980 births
Living people
Indian cricketers
Hyderabad cricketers
Cricketers from Hyderabad, India